Kismat Bajkul is a village, in Bhagabanpur I CD block in Egra subdivision of Purba Medinipur district in the state of West Bengal, India.

Geography

Location

Urbanisation
96.96% of the population of Egra subdivision live in the rural areas. Only 3.04% of the population live in the urban areas, and that is the lowest proportion of urban population amongst the four subdivisions in Purba Medinipur district.

Note: The map alongside presents some of the notable locations in the subdivision. All places marked in the map are linked in the larger full screen map.

Demographics
As per 2011 Census of India Kismat Bajkul had a total population of 17,964 of which 9,306 (52%) were males and 8,658 (48%) were females. Population below 6 years was 1994. The total number of literates in Kismat Bajkul was 14,781 (92.55 % of the population over 6 years).

Transport
SH 4 connecting Jhalda (in Purulia district) and Digha (in Purba Medinipur district) passes through Kismat Bajkul.

The nearest railway station is Deshapran railway station situated on the Tamluk-Digha line, constructed in 2003-04.

Education
Bajkul Milani Mahavidyalaya was established at Tethi Bari mouza, PO Kismat Bajkul, pin-721655, in 1964. It is affiliated to Vidyasagar University.

Healthcare
There is primary health centres at Kajlagarh (with 6 beds).

References

External links

Villages in Purba Medinipur district